Digelius Music is a record shop and internet retailer located in Viiskulma, Helsinki, Finland. It has been functioning in more or less the same place since 1971. Officially its business is "retail of music and video recordings." There are several record shops in the same or neighbouring blocks.

History of the record store 
Digelius Music had its beginnings in 1971. At that time, the future CEO of the record store, Emu Lehtinen was working in another record shop in Helsinki, Tunnelin levy. Lehtinen together with record importer Pertti Lehto and co-employee Tiina Ruolanne got the idea of founding their own record store. Digelius Electronics Finland, known for its owner, inventor Erkki Kurenniemi, invested in some of the shares as well. Kurenniemi had founded Digelius Electronics Finland together with Peter Frisk, with the aim of producing electronic instruments. They were known e.g. for the Dimi synthesizer.

Digelius Music had a successful start, but then Tiina Ruolanto moved to Sweden, and Digelius Electronics Finland went bankrupt. Now Juhani "Juntsa" Aalto came to the rescue and bought have of the shares of the record store. The shop was now owned by Lehtinen, Aalto, and three minor shareholders. Aalto's shares were later inherited by his sister. Now the name Digelius only survives in the name of this record shop. The word Digelius is an amalgam of the words digital and Sibelius.

Digelius Music was originally located on a street called Laivurinrinne, at the Viiskulma corner, in the same space which is now occupied by the record store Eronen. One morning in the 1990s, Lehtinen noticed that the sports store at the corner of Laivurinrinne and Fredrikinkatu had disappeared. Having thought about this for one night, he went into a bank and took a sizable loan. Since then Digelius Music has existed at this corner, the heart of the Viiskulma corner.

Digelius Music today 

It has been said that Digelius is one of the best known record stores in Finland. In the early days, all kinds of popular music was sold in the store, but since the 1980s, it has concentrated in jazz, jazz fusion, folk music and world music. It is also said that Digelius Music is an information center for jazz and world music, an in addition to this, it is occasionally a concert space and even a tourist attraction. One person writes about the store in the internet with the following words:

This writer tested the expertise of the store by asking about Azerbaidjani jazz. Soon the bearded man working in the store brought to him a pile of records to listen to. And he even seemed to enjoy this "inquiry that was goddam difficult.”

In addition to selling records, live jazz can be heard in Digelius Music on occasion. These are usually record launch events. For example, in 2014, the pianist Iiro Rantala has had such a concert at Digelius. In 2012 Digelius Music was awarded the Varjo-Yrjö ('Shadow Yrjö') award.

In the 1980s, Digelius also published records, at least those of Hasse Walli's Afro-Line.

Well known employees 
The best known person working in Digelius was Ilkka "Emu" Lehtinen, who is also the CEO of the record shop. In 2011, the Finnish Jazz Musicians' Association gave him the award "Jazz Digger of the Year". This award is given to a jazz listener, who "shows genuine and lasting interest in jazz music and represents a decent and open-minded community spirit". In addition, it was said that Lehtinen has acted as an encompassing and encouraging flag bearer for jazz music and as a person who brings musicians and their audiences together. The nickname "Emu" comes from Lehtinen's hobby, birdwatching.

Another important employee in the past was Phillip Page, an ex-patriate Texan, who worked at Digelius Music from 1987 on. He concentrated in providing the store with encompassing selections in world music, while Lehtinen's turf was jazz. In the early 1990s Page began to work as manager for various Finnish folk and world music acts, such as the JPP, Maria Kalaniemi and Värttinä. Nowadays he works as the manager for Kimmo Pohjonen.

According to Emu Lehtinen,

References

External links
Digelius Music homepages in English
Digelius internet store
Digelius in Elisa/Kolumbus website 
Digelius in Facebook
Digelius in Kauppalehti business info 
Record shops of Viiskulma 

Music retailers
Retail companies of Finland
Retail companies established in 1971
Punavuori
Music organisations based in Finland
Online retailers of Finland
Finnish companies established in 1971